Scooby-Doo, Where Are You Now! is a television special that premiered on October 29, 2021, on The CW. The special is a satire of "reunion specials", and features the Scooby-Doo characters, portrayed as actors playing fictional versions of themselves, reuniting at a Warner Bros. sound stage before getting caught up in a real mystery.

Voice cast
 Janel Parrish as Host
 Frank Welker as Fred Jones, Scooby-Doo, Jabberjaw (uncredited), The Great Gazoo (uncredited), and Himself
 Grey Griffin as Daphne Blake and Herself
 Matthew Lillard as Norville "Shaggy" Rogers and Himself
 Kate Micucci as Velma Dinkley and Herself
 Karamo Brown as Costume Designer Carter
 Brendan Jennings as Arlo Davidsonman
 Vadym Krasnenko as The Snow Ghost
 Olivia Liang as Martial Arts Trainer
 Mary Lynn Rajskub as Producer Bryn
 Baron Vaughn as Bram Penobscot

Additional voices
 Lindsey Alena
 Diedrich Bader as Batman
 Dominic Catrambone
 Fred Tatasciore as The Snow Ghost (uncredited)
 Natalie Palamides as Buttercup (uncredited)

Special guest star
 Cheri Oteri as Lazlo The Mechanic

Guests
 Jerry Beck
 Tony Cervone
 Seth Green
 David Silverman
 Tom Sito
 Mitch Watson
 "Weird Al" Yankovic
 Joseph Barbera (archive footage)

References

External links
 

2020s American television specials
2020s animated television specials
2021 television specials
2021 in American television
Scooby-Doo specials
The CW